The mixed team archery event was one of 5 archery events to take place at the 2020 Summer Olympics. It was held at Yumenoshima Park, with the ranking rounds taking place on 23 July and match play on 24 July. 16 teams competed in the knockout rounds, with the qualifying teams determined by the ranking rounds in which 29 different nations had at least one archer in each of the men's and women's divisions.

Background

This was a new event at the 2020 Games, in the first change to the archery programme since men's and women's team events were added in 1988. 

The mixed team event was first contested at a World Cup event in 2007. It was added as a demonstration event to the 2009 World Archery Championships, then as a full event to the 2011 World Archery Championships. It has been on the Youth Olympics programme since the 2010 Summer Youth Olympics and on the Paralympic program since the 2016 Summer Paralympics.

Qualification 

No quota spots are allocated directly to the mixed team event. Instead, qualifying for the mixed team competition is done at the Games themselves, during the men's and women's ranking rounds. Each National Olympic Committee (NOC) with at least one archer in both the men's individual and women's individual events has an opportunity to qualify. The score of the top man and top woman in the ranking round for each such NOC are summed to give a mixed team ranking round score; the top 16 NOCs qualify for the mixed team event's match play rounds.

Competition format

As with the other archery events, the mixed team was a recurve archery event, held under the World Archery-approved 70-meter distance and rules. 16 teams of 2 archers (one man, one woman) each participate in the match play rounds. Competition begins with the ranking round, in which each archer shoots 72 arrows (these are the same ranking rounds used for the men's individual event and women's individual event). The combined scores from the ranking round are used to seed the teams into a single-elimination bracket (with only the top 16 teams advancing). Each match consists of four sets of 4 arrows, two per archer. The team with the highest score in the set – the total of the four arrows – receives two set points; if the teams are tied, each receives one set point. The first team to five set points wins the match. If the match is tied at 4–4 after 4 sets, a tie-breaker set is used with each archer on the team shooting one arrow; if the score of the tie-breaker set remains tied, the closest arrow to the center wins.

Records

Prior to this competition, the existing world and Olympic records were as follows.

 144 arrow ranking round

Schedule

All times are Japan Standard Time (UTC+9)

The schedule for the mixed team event covered two separate days of competition.

Results

Ranking round

Competition bracket

Note: China swapped out its highest scoring archers from the ranking round. France swapped out its highest scoring men's archer from the ranking round.

 The figure in italics signifies the set scores.

References

Archery at the 2020 Summer Olympics
Mixed events at the 2020 Summer Olympics